Kristof Hopp (born 14 July 1978 in Kiel) is a male badminton player from Germany. In 2008, he won the bronze medal at the European Championships in the men's doubles event with Ingo Kindervater. At the same year, he competed at the Summer Olympics in Beijing, China.

Achievements

European Championships
Men's doubles

BWF Grand Prix
The BWF Grand Prix has two level such as Grand Prix and Grand Prix Gold. It is a series of badminton tournaments, sanctioned by Badminton World Federation (BWF) since 2007.

Men's doubles

Mixed doubles

 BWF Grand Prix Gold tournament
 BWF Grand Prix tournament

BWF International Challenge/Series
Men's doubles

Mixed doubles

 BWF International Challenge tournament
 BWF International Series tournament

References

External links
 

German male badminton players
1978 births
Living people
Sportspeople from Kiel
Badminton players at the 2008 Summer Olympics
Olympic badminton players of Germany